Acacia leucoclada, commonly known as the northern silver wattle, is a species of Acacia native to eastern Australia.

Description
It has angled to terete ridged branchlets. The tips of immature foliage are a silvery to whitish, coloured and densely haired. The seed pods that form after flowering are straight to slightly curved and occasionally twisted.

Taxonomy and naming
A. leucoclada was first described in 1966, by Mary Tindale. The specific epithet, leucoclada, derives from two Greek words: leucos (white) and clados (shoot/sprout) which were combined to give leucocladus, - a, -um, describing the plant as having white shoots.

Distribution
The range of A. leucoclada extends from south-eastern Queensland to the north coast, tablelands region, the western slopes of the Great Dividing Range, the central coast, Hunter River valley and Pilliga scrub regions of New South Wales. It is mostly found as far south as Wagga and is often part of sclerophyll woodland communities growing in a variety of different habitats and soil types.

See also
 List of Acacia species

References

leucoclada
Fabales of Australia
Flora of New South Wales
Flora of Queensland
Taxa named by Mary Tindale
Plants described in 1966